Burcu Kara (born 1 March 1980) is a Turkish actress. She is best known for hit series Haziran Gecesi and franchise films Romantik Komedi, Romantik Komedi 2: Bekarlığa Veda. 

With Burak Hakkı, she played in series "Maskeli Balo" and surreal comedy "Dünyayı Kurtaran Adam'ın Oğlu". She was cast in "Şuursuz Aşk", "Elveda Derken", "Kördüğüm", "O Şimdi Mahkum", "Kırmızı Oda", "Fandom", "Hakim".Her period roles are in "Tatar Ramazan", "Keşke Hiç Büyümeseydik", "İpsiz Recep", "Tozlu Yollar".

Filmography

TV series 
 Haziran Gecesi (Duygu) (2004)
 Elveda Derken (Zeynep) (2007)
 İpsiz Recep (Ayşe) (2008)
 Maskeli Balo (Zeynep) (2010)
 Kirli Beyaz (Zeynep) (2010)
 Yıllar Sonra (Seda) (2011)
 Tozlu Yollar (Feraye) (2013)
 Tatar Ramazan (Ebru) (2013)
 Milat (Gökçe) (2015)
 Kördüğüm
 Keşke Hiç Büyümeseydik (Serpil) (2018)
 Kırmızı Oda (Zuhal) (2020)
 Fandom
 Hakim (Ayşe Korkmaz) (2022)

Film 
 O Şimdi Mahkum (Speaker) (2005)
 Dünyayı Kurtaran Adamın Oğlu (Princess Maya) (2006)
 Romantik Komedi (Zeynep) (2010)
 Romantik Komedi 2: Bekarlığa Veda (Zeynep) (2013)
 Şuursuz Aşk (2019)
 Uçuş 811

TV programs 
 Cinesinema – 2005
 Burcu'yla – 2007
 Bayram Zamanı – 2007
 Benim Yolum – 2008
 NTV Yılbaşı – 2009
 Bi Dünya Tasarım – 2010–2013

Theatre 
 Güllü (Güllü) (2007)
 Tatlı Çarşamba (Ellen) (2012)
 Eğlenceli Cinayetler Kumpanyası (2015)

References 

1980 births
Living people
Turkish film actresses
Turkish television actresses
People from Bursa